Abdul Hamid Lahori (died 1654) was a traveller and historian during the period of Mughal Emperor Shah Jahan who later became a court historian of Shah Jahan (Shah Jahan's official chronicler). He wrote the book Padshahnama, about the reign of Shah Jahan. He has described Shah Jahan's life and activities during the first twenty years of his reign in this book in great detail Infirmities of old age prevented him from proceeding with the Third decade which was then chronicled by Waris, a historian.

Biography
Not much is known about the biographical details about Abdul Hamid Lahori, except from Amai-i Salih of Muhammad Salih, another court writer, who mentions his date of death to be 1654 AD.

In his own preface to the text, Lahori mentions that he was recalled from his retirement in Patna to write official history as the Emperor wanted someone who could emulate the style of Akbarnama of Abul Fazl which he too greatly admired. Abdul Hamid Lahori wrote the history of the first twenty years of Shah Jahan's rule in Padshahnama and completed the book in 1648 AD.

Taj Mahal
Taj Mahal, the world-renowned monument was built and completed by the end of 1653 or early 1654 in the 17th-century. Therefore, the 350th anniversary of Taj Mahal actually occurred around 1994. More than 20,000 workers toiled for years to build the majestic Taj Mahal with four slender minarets. It was built by the heartbroken Mughal emperor Shah Jahan in memory of his second wife, Empress Mumtaz Mahal, who had died in childbirth. Shah Jahan's official chronicler Abdul Hamid Lahori writes that the construction began six months after Empress Mumtaz Mahal's death which was on 17 June 1631.

Abdul Hamid Lahori also calls the glass pieces of the Sheesh Mahal of the Agra Fort as glass pieces "Shish-i-Halebi" because Haleb is the original Arabic name of Aleppo (Syria) which was the main centre for manufacturing these glass pieces. To build a strong foundation of this grand mausoleum known as the Taj Mahal, a network of wells was laid down along the river line and the wells were filled with stones and other solid materials.

He was widely-known to be a good scholar. He also had good knowledge of science and astronomy. Abdul Hamid  was called Lahori because he was from Lahore, Punjab although he died in Agra.

Works 

Bádsháh-Náma of 'Abdu-L Hamíd Láhorí Packard Humanities Institute

References

External links
The Padshahnama (Abdul Hamid Lahori's book written in 1656-57) at the Royal Collection Trust website

Historians from the Mughal Empire
Muslim writers
Historians of India
Year of birth unknown
1654 deaths
Writers from Lahore
People from Agra
17th-century Indian historians
17th-century Indian biographers
17th-century Indian non-fiction writers
17th-century Indian astronomers